The North American Computational Linguistics Open competition (NACLO), formerly called the North American Computational Linguistics Olympiad before January 1, 2020, is a computational linguistics competition for high school students in the United States and Canada that has been held since 2007. For the 2021 Open competition, approximately 1300 to 1400 students competed. Since 2008 the contest has consisted of two rounds, the second being administered to the top scorers in the first round. The top-scoring students on the second round qualify for the International Linguistics Olympiad (IOL), one of the international science olympiads.

History

Since the mid-1960s, problem-solving competitions in linguistics for secondary school students have been taking place at various locations around the world. In Russia, the Moscow and St. Petersburg Linguistic Olympiads are credited with inspiring hundreds of young talented scholars to choose linguistics as an academic major and profession. Presently there are national contests in Europe, Asia, South America, Australia and Africa, as well as North America. NACLO is part of a consortium that shares resources with other English-speaking contests such as the United Kingdom Linguistics Olympiad, OzCLO (Australia) and the All-Ireland Linguistics Olympiad. There is also an International Linguistic Olympiad in which students from many countries compete, as well as dozens of local competitions held in individual towns and schools across Europe and the USA.

In 1998 the first US Linguistics Olympiad was held at the University of Oregon in Eugene, Oregon, in 1998. 18 students participated the first year, 88 participated the second year, and 67 participated the third year of this local pilot program. From 2001 to 2006, the program existed as an informal, web-based educational activity known as the Linguistics Challenge.

The two US teams in each year won several awards at the IOL in 2007 and 2008. Each year, one of the two US teams won a gold medal (or first diploma) in the team contest. In addition, several team members won individual medals.

In 2019, following a request from the US Olympic Committee that NACLO comply with the Amateur Sports Act of 1978 (aka the Ted Stevens Act), which grants exclusive rights of usage in the US of the words Olympic and Olympiad to the Olympic Committee, the contest agreed to change its name to the North American Computational Linguistics Open competition.

Format

The format of the contest changed significantly between 2007 and 2008. The 2007 contest consisted of eight problems given in a single round open to all participants. The 2008 competition consisted of two rounds. The first round was open to all contestants and consisted of a three-hour, five-problem written examination. The top scorers on the open round advanced to the invitational round, which was a five-hour, seven-problem written examination divided into two parts; the first part lasted 3 and a half hours and contained five problems, while the second part lasted one and a half hour and contained two problems. The top eight scorers from the invitational round were selected to participate in the IOL. The booklets with problems and solutions are available on the main NACLO website.

IOL qualifiers
From 2007 to 2010 the USA sent two teams annually to the IOL.

In 2011 the USA sent three teams, and Canada also sent a team.

From 2012 to 2016, the USA sent two teams annually, and Canada sent one team annually.

From 2017 to 2019, the USA sent two teams and Canada sent two teams, one francophone and one anglophone.

References

See also
International Linguistics Olympiad
United States of America Computing Olympiad
USA Biology Olympiad
United States National Chemistry Olympiad
United States of America Mathematical Olympiad
Physics Olympiad
United Kingdom Linguistics Olympiad

External links 

 Official website

Linguistics olympiads